Dionysius "DZ" Harmon (born October 22, 1996) is a Liberian professional footballer who plays as a midfielder for Pittsburgh Riverhounds.

Career

Youth
Harmon played soccer at South Gwinnett High School, as well as at club level with local side Atlanta Silverbacks.

College and amateur
Harmon played a year of college soccer at Clayton State University in 2017, scoring 8 goals and tallying 1 assist in 17 appearances for the Lakers. Harmon transferred to Coastal Carolina University for 2018, where he played three seasons for the Chanticleers, scoring a single goal and tallying 4 assists in 45 appearances.  During his time at Coastal Carolina, Harmon helped the team to two Sun Belt Tournaments in 2019 and 2020, and one regular-season conference title in 2020 In 2019, he was named Second Team All-Sun Belt.

From 2017 to 2019, Harmon also appeared in the NPSL for Atlanta Silverbacks, who later re-branded at Atlanta SC in 2019.

In 2020, Harmon played with UPSL side Ginga Atlanta, helping the team to spring national title.

Professional
On May 6, 2021, Harmon signed with USL Championship side Charleston Battery following a successful trial. He made his professional debut on May 14, 2021, appearing as a 69th-minute substitute during a 0–3 defeat to Charlotte Independence. Following the 2022 season, Harmon was released by Charleston.

On March 2, 2023, Harmon signed with USL Championship side Pittsburgh Riverhounds.

References

External links
Clayton State bio
Coastal Carolina bio
Charleston Battery bio

1996 births
Liberian footballers
American soccer players
Liberian expatriate footballers
Association football midfielders
Atlanta Silverbacks players
Charleston Battery players
Clayton State Lakers men's soccer players
Coastal Carolina Chanticleers men's soccer players
Living people
National Premier Soccer League players
People from Loganville, Georgia
Pittsburgh Riverhounds SC players
Soccer players from Georgia (U.S. state)
USL Championship players